Vere may refer to:

Surname
 Charles Broke Vere (1779–1843), British soldier and Member of Parliament
 Charlotte Vere, Baroness Vere of Norbiton (born 1969), British politician
 Francis Vere (1560–1609), English soldier
 Horace Vere, 1st Baron Vere of Tilbury (1565–1635), English military leader

Given name
 Vere Benett-Stanford (1840–1894), MP for Shaftesbury
 Vere Fane, 4th Earl of Westmorland (1645–1693), British peer and MP for Peterborough and for Kent
 Vere Fane, 5th Earl of Westmorland (1678–1698), British peer and member of the House of Lords
 Vere Fane (MP) (fl. 1818), MP for Petersfield and Lyme Regis
 Vere Bonamy Fane (1863–1924), general in the British Indian Army
 Vere Fane, 14th Earl of Westmorland (1893–1948), British peer and equestrian
 Vere Monckton-Arundell, Viscountess Galway (1859–1921), British poet and philanthropist
 Vere Beauclerk, 1st Baron Vere (1699–1781), British peer and politician
 Vere Bird (1910–1999), first Prime Minister of Antigua and Barbuda
 Vere Gordon Childe (1892–1957), Australian archaeologist and philologist
 Vere Harmsworth, 3rd Viscount Rothermere (1925–1998), founder of the Mail on Sunday
 Vere Johns (1893–1966), impresario and radio personality
 Vere Lorrimer (died 1998), British television producer and director
 Vere Ponsonby, 9th Earl of Bessborough (1880–1956), British Conservative Party politician
 Vere St. Leger Goold (1853–1909), Irish tennis champion
 Wilbert Vere Awdry (1911–1997), creator of Thomas the Tank Engine
 William Vere Cruess (1886–1968), American food scientist
 Arthur Vere Harvey, Baron Harvey of Prestbury (1906–1994), British politician
 Henry Vere Huntley (1795–1864), English naval officer and colonial administrator
 William Vere Reeve King-Fane (1868–1943), English landowner, soldier and High Sheriff of Lincolnshire

Other uses
 Vere (footballer) (Alejandro Asensio Crespillo; born 2000), Spanish footballer
 Vere (river), in Georgia
 , any one of several vessels named Vere
 Vere Island, a former community of Newfoundland, Canada
 Vere language
 Egwene al'Vere, a character of the Wheel of Time fantasy series by Robert Jordan
 Xaver Hohenleiter, German brigand also known as Schwaaz Vere

See also
 Vere Street (disambiguation)
De Vere (disambiguation)
Ver (disambiguation)
Vera (disambiguation)
Verus (disambiguation)
Wehr (disambiguation)
WER (disambiguation)